Békéscsabai Előre Női Kézilabda Sport Egyesület is a Hungarian women's handball club from Békéscsaba, that plays in the Nemzeti Bajnokság I, after having been promoted in 2006.

Since they are sponsored by EUbility Group, the official name of the team is EUbility Group-Békéscsabai Előre NKSE.

History 
The birth of the team dated back to 1973, when multi-sports club Békéscsabai Előre Spartacus took over the local team Kötöttárugyár, and thus it became one of the departments of the club.

The team have promoted to the top level league first in 1980, and two years later they achieved their greatest success up to date, having won silver medal in the Hungarian championship and reaching the quarterfinals of the IHF Cup (predecessor of EHF Cup). However, the following two decades remained unsuccessful, the club turned into a mid-table team.

In 2000 the handball department seceded from the main club, which caused a staggering setback: with continually worsening results year after year, in 2004 Békéscsaba eventually got relegated.

Shocked by the results, the club with the support of the local government have worked out a long-term conception, mainly based on the new, rising generation. The club have always been well known for their grassroot programs, and have been honoured by the Hungarian Handball Federation for their work with youths in 2008.

At the end of 2006, Békéscsaba fought back to the top-tier championship, and after survived the first two seasons, a slow development has started. The team finished in 2008 in the eighth position, and achieved a fourth place in the following year, with that they earned a place in the EHF Cup.

Crest, colours, supporters

Naming history

Kit manufacturers and Shirt sponsor

The following table shows in detail Békéscsabai Előre NKSE kit manufacturers and shirt sponsors by year:

Kits

Sports Hall information

Name: – Városi Sportcsarnok
City: – Békéscsaba
Capacity: – 2300
Address: – 5600 Békéscsaba, Gyulai út 44.

Team

Current squad 
Squad for the 2022–23 seaso

Goalkeepers
 1  Marina Razum
 28  Claudia-Esther Madera Domokos
 61  Dóra Szabó
  Maja Gadányi
Left wingers
 4  Vanessza Hajtai
 33  Klára Kukely
Right wingers
 8  Flóra Andróczki
 17  Gréta Horváth
Line players
 9  Laura Giricz
 24  Szabina Mayer
 99  Bojána Bencsik

Left backs
 20  Kitti Gyimesi
 22  Lili Bucsi
 43  Rita Termány
 66  Zóra Zsemberi
 15  Mercédesz Kiss-Walfisch
Playmakers
 14  Panna Vámosi
 55  Fanni Török
 96  Márta Borbély
Right backs
 80  Marija Lanistanin

Transfers 

 Transfers for the 2023–24 season

 Joining

 Leaving
  Flóra Andróczki (RW) (to  MTK Budapest)

Staff members 
  Chairman: György Paláncz
  Managing director: Csaba Fülöp
  Professional director: Eszter Mátéfi
  Head coach: Bálint Papp
 Technical manager: György Petrovszki
 Goalkeeper Coach: Gyula Tóth
  Club Doctor: János Tóth, MD

Honours

Domestic competitions
Nemzeti Bajnokság I (National Championship of Hungary)
 Runners-up (1): 1982
 Third place (1): 1991–92

Magyar Kupa (National Cup of Hungary)
 Finalists (1): 2011–12

European competitions
EHF Cup
Semi-finalists: 1983–84

Recent seasons

Seasons in Nemzeti Bajnokság I: 39
Seasons in Nemzeti Bajnokság I/B: 9
Seasons in Nemzeti Bajnokság II: 1

In European competition
Békéscsabai Előre score listed first. As of 25 November 2018.

Participations in EHF Cup (IHF Cup): 4x
Participations in Cup Winners' Cup: 1x

Statistics: matches played: 16 – wins: 9 – draws: 1 – losses: 6 – goals scored: 435 – goals conceded: 380

Notable players 

  Éva Bozó
  Gabriella Jakab
  Mária Bolla
  Gabriella Salamon
  Beáta Bohus
  Rita Hochrajter
  Erika Sávolt
  Klára Szekeres
  Anita Cifra
  Bernadett Bódi
  Éva Vantara-Kelemen
  Eszter Laluska
  Hortenzia Szrnka
  Ágnes Triffa
  Olívia Kamper
  Kitti Kudor
  Katalin Tóth
  Viktória Csáki
  Szonja Gávai
  Mercédesz Walfisch
  Valéria Szabó
  Zsuzsanna Veress
  Mónika Kovacsicz
  Olha Nikolayenko
  Leposava Glušica
  Jovana Dukić
  Jovana Kovačević
  Marija Agbaba
  Dragica Tatalovic
  Olivera Tosovic
  Mariana Trbojevic
  Tamara Radojević
  Ivana Mitrović
  Jelena Agbaba
  Aleksandra Vukajlović
  Ivana Ljubas
  Tena Petika
  Zeneta Tothová
  Jasna Toskovic
  Natallia Vasileuskaya
  Elena Lipovka
  Georgeta Grigore

Coaches 
 Károly Szabó (1981–1987; 1989–1990; 1995–1998; 2000–2002; 2004–2005)
 György Buday (1988–1989)
 Sándor Rácz (1990–1991; 1998–1999)
 Pálné Csulik (1991–1992)
 Zoltán Fellegvári (1987)
 Lászlóné Tobak (1993–1995; 2002)
 József Farkas (1999–2000)
 Norbert Gera (2003–2004)
 Ferenc Gávai (2005)
 Tamás Rapatyi (2005–2007)
 Eszter Mátéfi (2007–2010)
 Beáta Bohus (2010–2011)
 Péter Kovács (2011–2012)
 Csaba Ökrös (2012–2013)
 Botond Bakó (2013–2014)
 György Avar (2014–2016)
 László Skaliczki (2016–2018)
 Roland Horváth (2018–2020)
 Gergő Vida (2020–2021)
 Bálint Papp (2021–)

See also 
 Békéscsaba 1912 Előre SE

References

External links 
Official website 

Coaches of Békéscsaba

Hungarian handball clubs
Handball clubs established in 1973
Békéscsaba